Byler Branch is a stream in Benton County in the U.S. state of Missouri. It is a tributary of Cole Camp Creek.

Byler Branch most likely derives its name from the surname Byler, which is found in local communities .

See also
List of rivers of Missouri

References

Rivers of Benton County, Missouri
Rivers of Missouri